Yelena Grigoryevna Granaturova (born 24 April 1953) is a former tennis player who competed for the Soviet Union.

In 1971 she won the French Open junior title by defeating French Florence Guédy in the final.

At Grand Slam level she played the first round at Wimbledon in 1975. Lost to Australian Kerry Reid. In 1974 at the VI european amateur tennis championship played in the doubles final with her partner Natasha Chmyreva.

WTA finals

Singles: 1 (0 titles, 1 runner-ups)

Doubles: 1 (0 titles, 1 runner-ups)

Career finals

Singles: 9 (3–6)

Doubles: 5 (1–4)

Junior Grand Slam titles

Girls' singles: 1 title

References

External links
 
 

1953 births
Living people
Soviet female tennis players
Grand Slam (tennis) champions in girls' singles
French Open junior champions